The Dwight and Clara Watson House is a Victorian home designed by Cass Gilbert in Saint Paul, Minnesota, United States, which is listed on the National Register of Historic Places.  It is one of the few surviving early-career works of Gilbert that showcases the detailed and eclectic style of an emerging master architect.

References

1886 establishments in Minnesota
Houses completed in 1886
Houses in Saint Paul, Minnesota
Houses on the National Register of Historic Places in Minnesota
Victorian architecture in Minnesota
National Register of Historic Places in Ramsey County, Minnesota